Reipå is a village in the municipality of Meløy in Nordland county, Norway. The lakes Lysvatnet and Markavatnet both lie to the east of the village. Fore Church is located in Reipå, serving northern Meløy.

References

Meløy
Villages in Nordland
Populated places of Arctic Norway